Sir Thomas Villiers Lister  (7 May 1832 – 26 February 1902) from the Villiers family was a British diplomat and the Assistant Under-Secretary of State for Foreign Affairs, 1873-94.

Early life 
Thomas Villiers Lister was the son of Thomas Henry Lister, Armitage Park, Staffordshire and Lady Maria Theresa Villiers.

Lister was educated at Harrow (Matric. Michs. 1850) and was admitted pensioner at Trinity College, Cambridge, on 19 October 1849. He graduated M.A. in 1853.

Career 
Lister entered the Foreign Office in 1853 and became Private Secretary to the Earl of Clarendon and précis writer to Lord John Russell. 1n 1853 he was attached to Lord John Russell's mission to Vienna. Two years later he was attached to the Earl of Clarendon's mission to Paris, and in 1861 to Earl Granville's special embassy to Prussia. From 1873 to 1894 he was the Assistant Under-Secretary of State for Foreign Affairs.

Honours 
 1856 Deputy Lieutenant (DL) of Edinburgh
 1885 Knight Commander of the Order of St Michael and St George (KCMG)

Personal life 
In 1862, Lister married Fanny Harriet Coryton, daughter of William Coryton of Pentillie Castle, Cornwall, and Harriet Sophia Parker (later Dowager Countess of Morley). They had seven children:
 Katherine Lister
 Constance Mary Lister
 George Coryton Lister
 Maria Theresa Lister
 Leonard Coryton Lister
 Edmund Algernon Coryton Lister
 Harry Coryton Lister
Fanny died in 1875. A memorial window was placed in the church of St. Mary, Plympton, Devon, by Fanny's mother and half-brother, Albert Edmund Parker.

In 1877 Lister married his second wife Florence Selina Hamilton, daughter of William John Hamilton and Hon. Margaret Frances Florence Dillon. They had five children:
 Mary Florence Lister
 Christine Sibyl Lister
 Margaret Evelyn Lister
 Frederick Hamilton Lister
 Algernon Hamilton Lister

References 

1832 births
1902 deaths
People educated at Harrow School
Alumni of Trinity College, Cambridge
Deputy Lieutenants of Edinburgh
Knights Commander of the Order of St Michael and St George
Thomas